Marie Victor Ignace Poterlet also called Marie Poterlet, Victor Poterlet, and M. Victor Poterlet (1811–1889) was a 19th-century French wallpaper designer, engraver and printmaker. His work is held in the collections of the Bibliothèque nationale de France and the Cooper Hewitt Smithsonian Design Museum.

Early life 
Porterlet was born in Auve, France in 1811.

Career 
Poterlet was a well-known wallpaper designer in the late 19th-century. His work is included in the 1847 book Ornements du 19me siècle Inventés et dessinés par divers artistes industriels et gravés par Martin Riester.

His 56-page sample book (numbered 1162) included machined and hand-made wallpaper samples made from embroideries, cut paper, and laces and is held in the Bibliotheque Forney (English Forney Library) in Paris, France.

A collection of his work is held in the collection of the Bibliothèque nationale de France, and the Cooper Hewitt Smithsonian Design Museum.

Family life 
Poterlet had a son, Henri Poterlet, who was also an ornamental engraver.

References

1811 births
1889 deaths
People from Marne (department)
19th-century French engravers
19th-century French male artists